KMSJ-LP 94.1 FM was a radio station licensed to Mt. Shasta, California. The station broadcast a Contemporary Christian music format and was owned by Mountain Christian Fellowship.

Mountain Christian Fellowship surrendered KMSJ-LP's license to the Federal Communications Commission on August 16, 2021, who cancelled it the same day.

References

External links
KMSJ's website
 

MSJ-LP
MSJ-LP
Radio stations established in 2003
2003 establishments in California
Defunct radio stations in the United States
Radio stations disestablished in 2021
2021 disestablishments in California
Defunct religious radio stations in the United States
MSJ-LP